Vitalis Chikoko (born February 11, 1991) is a Zimbabwean professional basketball player who plays for Élan Béarnais Pau-Orthez for the French Pro A.

Professional career 
In 2022, Chikoko helped Élan Béarnais win their fourth-ever French Cup by scoring 15 points and grabbing 8 rebounds in the final against SIG Strasbourg. After the game, he was named the French Cup Final MVP.

International career 
Chikoko has previously represented Zimbabwe on the international stage at both the junior and senior levels. He played for his country at the 2008 FIBA Africa Under-18 Championship and the FIBA AfroBasket 2011 qualifying rounds. On FIBA AfroBasket 2015 he averaged 13.4 points, 8.8 rebounds and 1.2 assists per game.

References

External links 
Vitalis Chikoko at Eurobasket.com
Vitalis Chikoko at NBADraft.net
Vitalis Chikoko at RealGM

1991 births
Living people
BG Göttingen players
Centers (basketball)
Élan Béarnais players
Zimbabwean expatriate basketball people in France
Zimbabwean expatriate basketball people in Germany
Zimbabwean expatriate basketball people in Italy
FC Bayern Munich basketball players
Metropolitans 92 players
Pallacanestro Reggiana players
Power forwards (basketball)
Scaligera Basket Verona players
Sportspeople from Harare
Zimbabwean men's basketball players